Niederdorfelden is a municipality in the Main-Kinzig district, in Hesse, Germany.

Town partnerships 
 Saint-Sever-Calvados, France

References

External links 
 Website Niederdorfelden (in German)

Municipalities in Hesse
Main-Kinzig-Kreis